Amor aumenta el valor is a 1728 opera by a collective of composers, the first act being by José de Nebra, the rest by the Italians Giacomo Facco and Filipo Falconi, which premiered in Lisbon in 1728.

Recording
  Amor aumenta el valor - Los Músicos de Su Alteza Luis Antonio González 1CD Alpha

References

1728 operas
Spanish-language operas
Baroque compositions
Operas